Willoughby Hickman (1688–1712) was a British politician who sat in the House of Commons from 1711 to 1712.

Hickman was the third son of Sir Willoughby Hickman, 3rd Baronet of  Gainsborough, Lincolnshire and his wife Anne Anderson, daughter of Sir Stephen Anderson, 1st Baronet, of Eyworth, Bedfordshire and was baptized on. 18 June 1688.  He matriculated at Christ Church, Oxford on 11 February 1705, aged 18.

Hickman contested East Retford as a Tory on his father's interest at the 1710 general election. He came third in the poll but was seated on petition as Member of Parliament on 11 January 1711. He served in Parliament for under 18 months and made little  contribution to Commons’ business before his death.

Hickman died in May 1712 and was buried at Gainsborough on 16 May 1712.

References

1688 births
1712 deaths
British MPs 1710–1713
Members of the Parliament of Great Britain for English constituencies